Nest of Wasps (Georgian:Krazanas bude) is a 1927 Soviet silent film directed by Ivane Perestiani.

The film's sets were designed by the art director Valerian Sidamon-Eristavi.

Cast
 Marius Jakobini as Jakob 
 Ivan Kruchinin as Menager 
 Maria Shirai as Lastochka  
 G. Meliava as Lumper proletar  
 Pavel Yesikovsky
 Marika Chimishkian as Rika  
 N. Qarumidze as Meri  
 S. Gubin 
 Aleksandr Shirai as Champion  
 Arkadi Khintibidze

References

Bibliography 
 Rollberg, Peter. Historical Dictionary of Russian and Soviet Cinema. Scarecrow Press, 2008.

External links 
 

1927 films
Soviet silent feature films
Georgian-language films
Films directed by Ivan Perestiani
Soviet black-and-white films
Soviet-era films from Georgia (country)